1 West India Quay is a landmark 33-storey mixed use skyscraper situated just north of Canary Wharf business district in east London. Completed in 2004, the development was built by Manhattan Loft Corporation and the now-defunct MWB Group Holdings. The distinctive glass- and aluminium-clad tower was designed by HOK. 

The building is 111 metres (364 feet) tall and has 33 floors (not including roof). The bottom 12 floors house a Marriott Hotel, including 47 serviced suites on floors 9–12. Floors 13-33 house 158 apartments. The tower overlooks West India Docks and the Canary Wharf estate.

History
In 2001, planning permission was gained by Squire and Partners for a slender landmark mixed-use tower conceived to act as a visual counterpoint to the monumental brick form of the adjacent Victorian warehouses in London's Docklands. Designed by HOK, its elliptical form is reminiscent of the curved hull of a boat. The plans were part of the redevelopment of the area. 

While works had been expected to finish in May 2004, the skyscraper was not handed over until December. A report in The Times said that MWB Group Holdings and its partner Manhattan Loft Corporation had "fallen out" with contractor Multiplex over the delays. Multiplex had been "demanding more than £100m in extra payment from MWB, claiming delays were caused by the changes MWB sought", with MWB refusing to pay. The dispute was escalated to an independent arbitrator for adjudication.

On-screen appearances
In the film Run Fatboy Run, the character Whit owns an apartment in 1 West India Quay. Early on in the film, he is heard saying "West India Quay please!" to a taxi driver. Whit proposes to Libby, played by Thandie Newton, on the staircase of one of the penthouses with floor-to-ceiling windows.

Whilst still a construction site, the building was used as a location in the film Layer Cake starring Daniel Craig.
	
Robert Carlyle's character in 28 Weeks Later escapes zombie apocalypse with his family by seeking refuge in the building.

Much of the music video "Heartbroken" by T2 (a London-based, garage music band) was filmed in or around 1 West India Quay.

The introduction of the show Richard Hammond's Invisible Worlds was filmed on the rooftop of 1 West India Quay, with Richard Hammond standing close to the building's signature arched top.

See also
List of tallest buildings and structures in London

References

External links

Emporis listing

Canary Wharf buildings
Skyscrapers in the London Borough of Tower Hamlets
Buildings and structures in the London Borough of Tower Hamlets
Residential buildings completed in 2004
Skyscraper hotels in London
Limehouse
HOK (firm) buildings